Enzo Vicario (5 July 1942) is an Italian bobsledder who competed in the early 1970s. He won a silver medal in the two-man event at the 1971 FIBT World Championships in Cervinia.

Vicario also finished tenth in the two-man event at the 1972 Winter Olympics in Sapporo.

References

External links
Bobsleigh two-man world championship medalists since 1931
Bobsleigh two-man Winter Olympic results: 1932-2006 

1942 births
Living people
Bobsledders at the 1972 Winter Olympics
Italian male bobsledders
Olympic bobsledders of Italy